The Women’s Singles tournament of the 2017 Stockton Challenger tennis championship took place in Stockton, US, between 17 July and 23 July 2017. 32 players from 10 countries took part in the 5-round tournament. The final winner was Sofia Kenin of the US, who defeated Ashley Kratzer of the US. The defending champion from 2016, Alison Van Uytvanck of Belgium, did not compete.

Seeds

Draw

Finals

Top half

Bottom half

References

External links
Main Draw

Stockton Challenger - Singles
Stockton Challenger
Sports competitions in Stockton, California
2017 in sports in California
Tennis in California